is a Japanese enka singer. She won best vocalist at the 42nd Japan Record Awards in 2000.

References

1963 births
Living people
Universal Music Japan artists